The Hansa-Brandenburg KDW was a German single-engine, single-seat, fighter floatplane of World War I. The KDWKampf Doppeldecker, Wasser (Fighter Biplane, Water)was adapted from the Hansa-Brandenburg D.I landplane to provide coastal defence over the North Sea.

It was produced under licence by the Austro-Hungarian manufacturer Phönix from 1916 in five batches, with progressively more powerful engines and armament, 58 aircraft in total being produced.

Design and development 

In 1916 the Imperial German Navy ordered the production of single-seat armed scout seaplanes (Jagdeinsitzer Wasser) to defend its North Sea seaplane stations against air attack. To deliver suitable aircraft quickly, the first designs were floatplanes based on existing landplane models. One such was the Hansa-Brandenburg KDW, adapted by the company's chief designer, Ernst Heinkel, from his Hansa-Brandenburg D.I.

The D.I was a single-seat scout with novel and distinctive "star strutter" wing bracing. On each side of the aircraft four vee struts, two facing up, two facing down, were joined by their vertices at a point midway between the upper and lower wings, forming an eight-armed star configuration that gave the plane its nickname Spinne (spider).

The KDW was essentially the D.I with a small increase in wingspan and mounted on a twin-float chassis. To counteract the keel effect resulting from the floats, which were below the aircraft's centre of gravity, vertical tailfin area was added below and later above the fuselage. Even with the added tailfin area, the aircraft's lateral stabilityits tendency to return from a bank to vertical flightwas below par. Moreover, the deep fuselage tended to blanket the small tailfin and rudder, making directional stability and control very poor.

Operational history
The KDW was produced in Austria-Hungary under license by Phönix. 58 were built in five production batches. The first batch entered combat in late 1916. The wings extended well beyond the outboard ends of the star struts, and it was found that this unbraced part of the upper wing flexed when the ailerons were actuated, reducing their effectiveness. Starting with the second batch a light steel-tube vee brace was added outboard of the star struts to stiffen the outer upper wing.

The first three batches were equipped with the  Benz Bz.III engine. The last two batches, 35 aircraft in total, were equipped with the  Maybach Mb.III engine. The first four batches were armed with one fixed Spandau machine gun, mounted on the starboard side of the nose. The final batch of 20 aircraft, delivered between October 1917 and February 1918, were armed with twin Spandau machine guns on either side of the cockpit.

Production was slow, so that many were obsolete almost as soon as they reached their units. They were difficult to fly because of the aforementioned poor directional stability. Recovery from a spin was a matter of luck. Another reason it was unpopular with pilots was that, until the final batch, the armament was positioned out of their reach, making it impossible to clear stoppages while airborne.

Operators

Imperial German Navy

Specifications (KDW)

See also

Notes

References

Bibliography

1910s German fighter aircraft
KDW
Floatplanes
Single-engined tractor aircraft
Biplanes
Aircraft first flown in 1916